Members of the New South Wales Legislative Assembly  who served in the 39th  parliament held their seats from 1959 to 1962. They were elected at the 1959 state election, and at by-elections. The Speaker was Ray Maher.

See also
Fourth Cahill ministry 
First Heffron ministry
Results of the 1959 New South Wales state election
Candidates of the 1959 New South Wales state election

References

Members of New South Wales parliaments by term
20th-century Australian politicians